The Lunacy (Ireland) Act 1821 formed the basis of mental health law in Ireland from 1821 until 2015.

Background
Prior to the Lunacy (Ireland) Act, there had been only limited progress with establishing specialist accommodation for the mentally ill in Ireland. The only such facilities were the Eglinton Asylum in Cork and the Richmond Asylum in Dublin.

Provisions
The legislation authorised the appointment of a Commission of General Control and Correspondence to have oversight of asylums in Ireland. It also gave powers to the Lord Lieutenant of Ireland to establish and operate publicly funded "district asylums" across the island of Ireland.

Subsequent legislation
Although the Lunacy Regulation (Ireland) Act 1871 made some changes relating to Commissioners in Lunacy, the management of the Estates of Lunatics and for the protection of the property of Lunatics in Ireland, aspects of the legislation remained in force until repealed by the Assisted Decision Making (Capacity) Act 2015.

References

1821 in British law
United Kingdom Acts of Parliament 1821
Acts of the Parliament of the United Kingdom concerning Ireland
Legal history of Ireland
Mental health legal history of the United Kingdom